The 2014 ICC World Cup Qualifier  was a cricket tournament that formed the final part of the Cricket World Cup qualification process for the 2015 World Cup. The top two teams qualified for the World Cup, joining Ireland and for the first time Afghanistan, both of whom already qualified through the 2011–13 ICC World Cricket League Championship and maintained their ODI status. The World Cup Qualifier was the final event of the 2009–14 World Cricket League. It was staged in New Zealand, from 13 January to 1 February 2014 after Scotland relinquished the right to host it. Scotland was originally scheduled to host the tournament in July and August 2013.

The tournament saw Scotland, who won the final against the UAE, qualifying for their 3rd World Cup and retaining their ODI status, and runners up the UAE qualifying for their second world cup and gaining ODI status. Despite not qualifying for the World Cup, Hong Kong and Papua New Guinea gained ODI status for the first time by finishing the tournament in 3rd and 4th places respectively.

The tournament also saw leading associate countries Kenya, the Netherlands and Canada fail to qualify for the World Cup and lose their ODI status till 2018, although the Netherlands did qualify for the 2014 ICC World Twenty20 instead of Scotland.

Format
According to ICC "the 10 teams were to be equally divided into two groups with the top three sides from each group progressing to the Super Six stage. The top two sides from the Super Six stage would not only reach the final but would also qualify for the ICC Cricket World Cup 2015 to complete the 14-team tally. Top 4 team would get ODI status where as 5th, 6th, 7th & 8th placed teams would remain or be relegated to Division 2"

Teams
The tournament followed the conclusion of the 2011–13 ICC World Cricket League Championship. The top two teams from this tournament, Ireland and Afghanistan, qualified for the 2015 World Cup, with the remaining six teams entering the World Cup Qualifier. They were joined by the third and fourth-placed teams from 2011 ICC World Cricket League Division Two and the top two teams from 2013 ICC World Cricket League Division Three.

Venues

Match officials
Officiating the tournament were three match referees and in all during the tournament, there were 14 umpires who would officiate, including Marais Erasmus of the Emirates Elite Panel of ICC Umpires while the remaining 13 representatives were from the Emirates International Panel of ICC Umpires and the ICC Associates and Affiliates Umpires' Panel.

Umpires
 Ahsan Raza
 Billy Bowden
 Johan Cloete
 Marais Erasmus
 Chris Gaffaney
 Shaun George
 Michael Gough
 Vineet Kulkarni
 Mick Martell
 Enamul Haque
 Peter Nero
 Tim Robinson
 Joel Wilson
 Ruchira Palliyaguru

Match referees
 Jeff Crowe
 Roshan Mahanama
 Dev Govindjee

Players

Warm-up matches

10 non ODI warmup games were played before the tournament started.

Group stage

Group A

Points table

Fixtures / Results

Group B

Points table

Fixtures / Results

Playoffs

Super Six

Points table
Results of matches between qualified teams were carried over from the group stage.

Fixtures / Results

Final

Final standings

Statistics

Most runs

Most wickets

See also
ICC World Cricket League
2015 World Cup

References
Notes

Sources
World Cricket League structure
Scotland wash hands of WCQ tournament

External links
Official website
Tournament website on ESPN Cricinfo

World Cup Qualifier
World Cup Qualifier
World Cup Qualifier
2013 Cup Qualifier
ICC World Cup Qualifier
Cricket World Cup Qualifier